Zero interest-rate policy (ZIRP) is a macroeconomic concept describing conditions with a very low nominal interest rate, such as those in contemporary Japan and in the United States from December 2008 through December 2015. ZIRP is considered to be an unconventional monetary policy instrument and can be associated with slow economic growth, deflation and deleverage.

Overview
Under ZIRP, the central bank maintains a 0% nominal interest rate. The ZIRP is an important milestone in monetary policy because the central bank is typically no longer able to reduce nominal interest rates. ZIRP is very closely related to the problem of a liquidity trap, where nominal interest rates cannot adjust downward at a time when savings exceed investment.

However, some economists—such as market monetarists—believe that unconventional monetary policy such as quantitative easing can be effective at the zero lower bound.

Others argue that when monetary policy is already used to the maximal extent, to governments must be willing to use fiscal policy to create jobs. The fiscal multiplier of government spending is expected to be larger when nominal interest rates are zero than they would be when nominal interest rates are above zero. Keynesian economics holds that the multiplier is above one, meaning government spending effectively boosts output.  In his paper on this topic, Michael Woodford finds that, in a ZIRP situation, the optimal policy for government is to spend enough in stimulus to cover the entire output gap.

Chris Modica and Warren Sulmasy find that the ZIRP policy follows from the need to refinance a high level of  US public debt and from the need to recapitalize the world's banking system in the wake of the Financial crisis of 2007–2008.

Zero lower bound
The zero lower bound problem refers to a situation in which the short-term nominal interest rate is zero, or just above zero, causing a liquidity trap and limiting the capacity that the central bank has to stimulate economic growth. This problem returned to prominence with the Japan's experience during the 1990s and more recently with the subprime crisis. The belief that monetary policy under the ZLB was effective in promoting economy growth has been critiqued by economists Paul Krugman, Gauti Eggertsson and Michael Woodford among others. Milton Friedman, on the other hand, argued that a zero nominal interest rate presents no problem for monetary policy as a central bank can increase the monetary base only if it continues buying bonds.

See also

 History of Federal Open Market Committee actions
 Janet Yellen
 Ben Bernanke
 Excess reserves
 Federal funds rate
 Forward guidance
 Negative interest rate
 Natural rate of interest
 Real interest rate
 Stagflation
 Liquidity trap
 Speculative bubble
 Too big to fail

 Yield Curve Control

References

Further reading

External links
Monetary Policy Alternatives at the Zero Bound: An Empirical Assessment
Fed Funds Rate: Turning Japanese, I Really Think So
Nominal Interest Rates: Less Than Zero?
Macroeconomics Wiki: Zero Lower Bound Problem

Interest rates
Monetary policy